= HALLEX =

HALLEX (Hearings, Appeals and Litigation Law Manual) is a publication from the Social Security Administration's Office of Disability Adjudication and Review (ODAR). ODAR administers hearings and appeals for people seeking reviews of their applications for disability benefits. HALLEX contains policy statements from the SSA's Appeals Council, as well as procedures, directed to lower levels of the SSA, for carrying out the SSA's guiding principles.
